Three ships of the Japanese Navy have been named Tsushima:

 , a  launched in 1902 and struck in 1936
 , an  launched in 1943, she was surrendered to China in 1947 and renamed Lin An
 , a  launched in 1990 and struck in 2016

Japanese Navy ship names
Imperial Japanese Navy ship names